Honours won by the Brisbane Broncos include six National Rugby League Premierships and two World Club Challenge titles. In addition the club and its players have won several more honours and awards since the Broncos were founded in 1988.

Team honours

Premierships (6/28)

Runners-up (1/28)

Minor Premierships (4/28)

World Club Challenges (2/5)

Finals (23/28)
The Broncos qualified for the NSWRL/ARL/SL/NRL finals in the following years. 
1990, 1992, 1993, 1994, 1995, 1996, 1997, 1998, 1999, 2000, 2001, 2002, 2003, 2004, 2005, 2006, 2007, 2008, 2009, 2011, 2012, 2014 and 2015

Individual honours

Rothmans Medal
The Rothmans Medal is awarded to Player of the Year from the years 1968–1996.

Dally M. Medal
The Dally M. Medal is a different system to Player of the Year. It started in 1980 and became the official award of the NRL in 1998

Clive Churchill Medal
The Clive Churchill Medal is awarded to the Man of the Match in a grand final

Club awards
Each year the Paul Morgan Medal is awarded to the Broncos' best and fairest player of the season.

Famous fans
 Peter Beattie, a former Queensland Premier, chairman of the Australian Rugby League Commission.
 Steve Irwin (since deceased), a crocodile hunter
Sally Pearson, an Australia athlete,
 Lachlan Murdoch, a businessman and a former No. 1 ticket holder
 Susie O'Neill
 Pat Rafter, a retired Australian tennis player
 Kevin Rudd, a former Australian Prime Minister and the current No. 1 ticket holder
 Jim Soorley, a former Lord Mayor of Brisbane and a former No. 1 ticket holder
 Andrew Symonds, an Australian and Queensland cricketer

National Youth Competition honours

The Broncos were runners up in the 2008 NYC grand final.

See also

References

Honours
Rugby league trophies and awards
National Rugby League lists
Brisbane sport-related lists